Artur da Silva Quaresma (27 June 1917 – 2 December 2011) was a Portuguese footballer who played as a forward.

Club career
Born in Barreiro, Setúbal District, Quaresma started playing with local F.C. Barreirense in the second division. In the summer of 1936 he moved to the Primeira Liga with C.F. Os Belenenses, where he would remain for the following 13 seasons, working as an electrician after training.

In 1945–46, as the Lisbon-based team won their first and only national championship, Quaresma scored 14 goals in 22 matches. He retired on 5 October 1948 at only 30 years of age following a game against neighbouring Sporting CP (4–1 home win, two goals), then acted as his main club's coach during the same campaign, leading it to the third position. He worked with the youth sides in the following years.

International career
Quaresma earned five caps for Portugal, appearing in as many friendlies over the course of eight years. He made his debut on 28 November 1937, against Spain (2–1 win in Vigo); before that match he, alongside teammates Mariano Amaro, João Azevedo and José Simões, refused to perform the fascist salute, being subsequently questioned by PIDE.

Personal life and death
Quaresma died in his hometown of Barreiro on 2 December 2011, at the age of 94. Many media outlets referred to him as being the great-uncle of another footballer, Ricardo Quaresma, who played with individual and team success for FC Porto and was also an international; the latter later denied this, however, but referred to the former as an "inspiration to overcome adversity in life".

Honours
Belenenses
Primeira Liga: 1945–46
Taça de Portugal: 1941–42; Runner-up 1939–40, 1940–41, 1947–48

References

External links

1917 births
2011 deaths
Sportspeople from Barreiro, Portugal
Portuguese footballers
Association football forwards
Primeira Liga players
F.C. Barreirense players
C.F. Os Belenenses players
C.F. Os Belenenses managers
O Elvas C.A.D. players
Portugal international footballers
Portuguese football managers
Primeira Liga managers
Rio Ave F.C. managers
S.C. Braga managers